Robert (Red) Noel (September 17, 1925 – January 2, 1997) was a Canadian football player who played for the Regina Roughriders and Montreal Alouettes. He attended the University of Maine. He died in 1997.

References

1925 births
1997 deaths
American football ends
Canadian football ends
Maine Black Bears football players
Saskatchewan Roughriders players
Montreal Alouettes players
Players of American football from Massachusetts